The  is an annual outdoor track and field competition, organized by Japan Association of Athletics Federations. Currently it takes place in June or July. The competition is also for the qualifying trial for the Japanese national team of international competitions.

History

In 1925, the Japan Amateur Athletic Federation (JAAF) was organized. Since then, the competition have been organized by the JAAF.

Events

The following athletics events feature on the national championships.

 Sprint: 100 m, 200 m, 400 m
 Middle distance: 800 m, 1500 m
 Long distance: 5000 m, 10,000 m
 Hurdles: 100 m hurdles, 110 m hurdles, 400 m hurdles, 3000 m SC
 Jumps: Long jump, Triple jump, High jump, Pole vault
 Throws: Shot put, Discus throw, Hammer throw, Javelin throw

Other events
As of 2016, the following events are separate competitions for date and venue from the outdoor championships.

 Combined event: Decathlon and Heptathlon.  meaning Japan Championships in Athletics Combined event, it takes place in June.
 Relays: 4 × 100 m relays and 4 × 400 m relays.  meaning Japan Championships in Athletics Relay, it takes place in October.
 Marathon: The competition differ by year, is designated as a national championships.
 Race walk: 20 km and 50 km.  meaning Japan Championships in Athletics 20 kilometres Race Walk, it takes place in Kobe in February.  meaning Japan Championships in Athletics 50 kilometres Race Walk, it takes place in Wajima, Ishikawa in April.
 Cross country:  meaning Japan Championships in Athletics Cross country, formerly known as Fukuoka International Cross Country, it takes place in Fukuoka in February.

Editions

Records

Eligibility 
As of 2020, registered athletes of Japan Association of Athletics Federations (including foreigners who are born and raised in Japan) who have Japanese nationality must fall in either of these conditions.

 Winner of the previous Japan Championships in Athletics
 Broken the participation standard record A (a common standard set mainly by the tournament organizer for athletes as a standard for permitting participation and participation)
 Won the 3rd place in each category in the 2019 regional championships (excluding the Tokyo championships) and met the participation standard record B (a lower standard compared to standard record A)

See also
List of Japanese records in athletics
:Category:National athletics champions

References

External links

 100th competition's Official website  from JAAF
 Official website  from JAAF
 Official website - English Topics from JAAF

 
Athletics competitions in Japan
Recurring sporting events established in 1913
National athletics competitions
1913 establishments in Japan